Ruth Myers (born 1940) is a British costume designer. She has received two Academy Award nominations as well as two BAFTA nominations and has won an Emmy Award for costumes. In 2008, she received the Career Achievement Award at the Costume Designers Guild Awards.

Career
Ruth Myers grew up in Manchester and attended the St. Martin's School of Art in London. Early in her career, she sewed sequins for Anthony Powell while also working as an assistant to Sophie Devine (costume designer for classic English films). Myers then turned to theatre and low-budget films such as the 1967 comedy Smashing Time. Upon being persuaded by Gene Wilder, Myers moved to the U.S. and worked with him on the films The World's Greatest Lover, The Woman in Red, and Haunted Honeymoon.

Ruth Myers was the costume designer on the film The Russia House, notable for the costumes and splendid clothing worn by Roy Scheider.

Myers acted as costume designer for the 2002 film The Four Feathers, the 2006 film Monster House and the 2008 film City of Ember (which were both directed by Gil Kenan). She worked with Kevin Spacey in the films L.A. Confidential and Beyond the Sea. For the latter production, she used textiles from the 1950s and 1960s and ultimately designed 65 outfit changes for Spacey that appear in the film. The actor, who portrayed singer Bobby Darin, had to wear a wide range of costumes as a reflection of his life's journey, from bright suits to his signature red sweater.

In 2008 Myers received the Career Achievement Award at the Costume Designers Guild Awards. In 2011 she designed the costumes for the supernatural teen drama film Vampire Academy. The following year, Myers oversaw costume design for the television miniseries Hemingway & Gellhorn. Myers' efforts earned her a nomination in the outstanding made-for-television movie or miniseries category at the Costume Designers Guild Awards.

Ruth Myers is the proprietor of Ruth Myers Costume Design.

Award history

Oscar nominations
Both are in the category of Best Costumes.

64th Academy Awards-Nominated for The Addams Family. Lost to Bugsy.
69th Academy Awards-Nominated for Emma. Lost to The English Patient.

Emmy nominations
Both are for costumes.

56th Primetime Emmy Awards-Carnivàle-Won.
64th Primetime Creative Arts Emmy Awards-Nominated for Hemingway & Gellhorn. Lost to Great Expectations.

BAFTA nominations
Both are for Best Costume Design.

23rd British Academy Film Awards-Nominated for Isadora. Lost to Oh! What a Lovely War.
51st British Academy Film Awards-Nominated for L.A. Confidential. Lost to Mrs Brown.

References

External links

1940 births
British costume designers
Living people
Designers from Greater Manchester
Emmy Award winners
Women costume designers